Phalium faurotis is a species of large sea snail, a marine gastropod mollusk in the family Cassidae, the helmet snails and bonnet snails.

Description

Distribution
This marine species occurs in the Gulf of Aden.

References

 Steyn, D.G & Lussi, M. (2005). Offshore Shells of Southern Africa: A pictorial guide to more than 750 Gastropods. Published by the authors. Pp. i–vi, 1–289

External links
 Jousseaume, F. (1888). Description des mollusques recueillis par M. le Dr. Faurot dans la Mer Rouge et le Golfe d'Aden. Mémoires de la Société Zoologique de France. 1: 165-223

Cassidae